Ivory Coast national under-20 football team, also known as Côte d'Ivoire Under-20s or Ivory Coast U20(s), represents Ivory Coast in association football at an under-20 age level and is controlled by Ivorian Football Federation, the governing body for football in Ivory Coast.

Players

Current squad

Achievements
 1977 FIFA World Youth Championship (Qualified)
 1983 FIFA World Youth Championship (Qualified)
 1991 FIFA World Youth Championship (Qualified)
 1997 FIFA World Youth Championship (Qualified)
 2003 FIFA World Youth Championship (Qualified)
 2011 African Youth Championship qualification (2nd preliminary round )

Past squads
 1977 FIFA World Youth Championship squads
 1983 FIFA World Youth Championship squads
 1991 FIFA World Youth Championship squads
 1997 FIFA World Youth Championship squads
 2003 FIFA World Youth Championship squads

References

External links 
 FIFA U-20 World Cup website

under-20
African national under-20 association football teams